Thomas Crowley (20th April 1949 – 10 June 1995) was an Irishman who fought in the Croatian War of Independence.

Initially a member of the British Army, he travelled to Croatia in 1991 and joined as a volunteer with the Croatian Defence Forces. He was assigned to the Ante Paradžik First Battalion, and participated as a commando in battles at Dubrovnik, Livno, Mostar, Popovo Polje, Operation Maslenica, and the liberation of Skabrnje. He was wounded at Zemunik.

In 1994 he led a training camp for the 114th brigade which trained more than 2,000 soldiers. 

Tomislav Kraulić (his other nickname which would be Croatian version of Thomas Crowley) was shy and rarely talked about himself. In his request for Croatian citizenship he wrote: " I came to Croatia to fight for its freedom. I would like to stay here after the war is over and live here if I survive. I like Croatia and Croatian people. This is my home."

He was killed in action near Dubrovnik in 1995 and is buried near Split. Upon his death he held the rank of Major in the Croatian Defence Forces and in 2012 was posthumously awarded the Croatian Order of Petar Zrinski and Fran Krsto Frankopan.

References

1949 births
1995 deaths
Croatian army officers
Irish mercenaries
Military personnel of the Bosnian War
Military personnel of the Croatian War of Independence
Military personnel killed in the Croatian War of Independence
Croatian military personnel killed in action